Yury Moshkin (born 1931) is a retired Soviet skier. He placed 13th in the Nordic combined and 34th in ski jumping at the 1956 Winter Olympics. In the Nordic combined competition he won the ski jumping event, but finished only 31st in the cross-country race.

References

External links
 

1931 births
Possibly living people
Soviet male ski jumpers
Soviet male Nordic combined skiers
Olympic ski jumpers of the Soviet Union
Ski jumpers at the 1956 Winter Olympics
Nordic combined skiers at the 1956 Winter Olympics
Sportspeople from Nizhny Novgorod Oblast